It Don't Get Any Better Than This is an album by American country music singer George Jones released on April 7, 1998, on the MCA Nashville label.

Jones's 55th studio album would be his last with MCA Nashville Records.  The album's title track was used as the theme song to Jones's talk show which aired on what was then The Nashville Network. The program featured informal chats with Jones holding court with country's biggest stars old and new, and music.  Guests included Loretta Lynn, Trace Adkins, Johnny Paycheck, Lorrie Morgan, Merle Haggard, Billy Ray Cyrus, Tim McGraw, Faith Hill, Charley Pride, Bobby Bare, Patty Loveless and Waylon Jennings, among others. "Wild Irish Rose" was released as a single, but failed to chart, a common occurrence for Jones in recent years since he was no longer played on mainstream country radio.

The song "It Doesn't Get Any Better Than This" includes several guest vocalists, in order of appearance they are: Waylon Jennings, the Johnny Cash impersonator, Johnny Counterfit (incorrectly credited as "Johnny Counterfeit" in the liner notes), Merle Haggard, Bobby Bare, and Willie Nelson.  The song "Got to Get to Louisiana" is a duet with T. Graham Brown.

"When Did You Stop Loving Me" is a cover of the 1993 Top Ten single by George Strait from the soundtrack to the 1992 film Pure Country.  "Small Y'all" was originally recorded by Randy Travis on his 1994 album This Is Me, and later re-recorded by Jones as a duet with Kenny Chesney on Chesney's 2010 album Hemingway's Whiskey.  "Smack Dab" was later recorded by Ken Mellons on his 2004  album Sweet.  "Don't Touch Me" is a cover of the 1966 #2 country hit single by Jeannie Seely.  The album also features several songs written by Nashville veteran Bobby Braddock, who co-wrote "He Stopped Loving Her Today".

Reception
AllMusic states of the album: "It's not a bad record by any means, and George is in surprisingly good voice, hardly sounding like a man approaching his 70th birthday. Still, there's no truly great performances or unusual songs to make it worth putting on after the initial play."

Track listing

Personnel
As listed in liner notes.

 Eddie Bayers – drums
 David Briggs – piano, Hammond B-3 organ
 Buddy Cannon – acoustic guitar
 Mark Casstevens – acoustic guitar
 Larry Franklin – fiddle
 Keith Gattis – electric guitar
 Carl Gorodetzky – orchestra conductor
 Randy Howard – fiddle, mandolin
 John Hughey – pedal steel guitar
 George Jones – vocals
 Paul Leim – drums, tambourine
 Terry McMillan – harmonica
 Larry Marrs – backing vocals
 Farrell Morris – vibraphone
 Louis Dean Nunley – backing vocals
 Jennifer O'Brian – backing vocals
 Larry Paxton – bass guitar, baritone guitar
 Hargus "Pig" Robbins – piano
 John Wesley Ryles – background vocals
 Scott Sanders – steel guitar
 Gary Smith – piano, clavinet
 Wayne Toups – accordion
 Pete Wade – electric guitar
 Bergen White – backing vocals, string arrangements
 Dennis Wilson – backing vocals
 Nashville String Machine – string orchestra

References

1998 albums
George Jones albums
MCA Records albums
Albums produced by Buddy Cannon
Albums produced by Norro Wilson